Jena Malone is an American actress who has appeared in over 40 feature films since beginning her career as a child actor in 1996. She gained critical acclaim for her film debut in Anjelica Huston's  Bastard Out of Carolina (1996), followed by supporting parts in major studio films such as Contact with Jodie Foster (1997) and Stepmom with Julia Roberts (1998). She subsequently had roles in the cult film Donnie Darko, and the drama Life as a House (both 2001), before having starring roles in the independent American Girl (2002), the dark comedy Saved! (2004), and the drama The Ballad of Jack and Rose (2005).

She co-starred as Lydia Bennet in the 2005 adaptation of Pride & Prejudice before making her Broadway theater debut as Sister James in Doubt, in 2006. Subsequent film roles include supporting parts in the arthouse drama Lying, the biographical drama Into the Wild (2007), and the supernatural horror film The Ruins (2008). In 2011, she appeared in the action film Sucker Punch before being cast as Johanna Mason in The Hunger Games film series, appearing in a total of three films between 2013 and 2015. She also had roles in Nicolas Winding Refn's controversial horror film The Neon Demon, and Tom Ford's thriller Nocturnal Animals (both 2016). In 2021, she starred in Adopting Audrey.

Film

Television

Music videos

Stage

References

Actress filmographies
American filmographies